Cycling at the 1974 Asian Games was held at the Aryamehr Velodrome in Aryamehr Sport Complex, Tehran, Iran between 5 and 14 September 1974.

Medalists

Road

Track

Medal table

References 

 New Straits Times, September 7–16, 1974
 The Straits Times, September 7–16, 1974

 
1974 Asian Games events
1974
Asian Games
1974 Asian Games
1974 in road cycling
1974 in track cycling